Purim Rattanaruangwattana (born 21 May 1997), nicknamed Pluem, is a Thai actor and singer. He started acting in the 2013 movie Grean Fictions and its sequel TV series, Grean House. He has done both film and television in succeeding years.

Pluem is perhaps best known for his role as Inthanu (“In”) in the GMM 25 series My Dear Loser: Edge of 17. Pluem later reprised the role of Inthanu in My Dear Loser: Happy Ever After and the anthology series Our Skyy.

Personal life
Purim was born and raised in Chiang Mai Province, Thailand, the second of two children, having one older brother. He speaks Northern Thai in a Bangkok accent. He has a Chinese father and a Thai mother. His nickname "Pluem" means joy and happiness in Thai.

In 2016, he graduated from The Prince Royal's College in Chiang Mai, Thailand.

Currently, he studies at the Faculty of Political Science and Public Administration, Chiang Mai University. As a student, his goal is to keep a GPA of 3 and above. In August 2019, Pluem started his internship.

Career
In order to fulfill his childhood dream of becoming a policeman, Pluem went to a supplementary school. There, he met film director Chookiat Sakveerakul while passing by the director's studio.

Thus, his acting career started in 2013. He initially thought his career would end after the film Grean Fictions. However, he grew fond of it after doing more films and shows.

In 2015 Pluem was a member and used to be bassit of the now defunct boy pop band SLEEPRUNWAY together with Kao Jirayu-La-ongmanee, JJ Kritsanapoom Pibulsonggram, Nontanun Anchuleepradit and Chalat Gamol.

His television credits from 2014 to 2017 include Greanhouse: The Series, Fly To Fin, Slam Dance, and the My Dear Loser series.

In 2017, Pluem co-starred in the Thai horror movie Siam Square.

In 2018, aside from reprising the role of Inthanu in the anthology series Our Skyy, Pluem starred in the critically acclaimed Thai drama Happy Birthday: The Series, where he played the leading role of Tonmai, a neglected boy whose sister died on the day he was born.

Pluem frequently collaborates with fellow GMMTV artists, most popularly with Chimon Wachirawit Ruangwiwat, who played the character of Sun opposite Pluem's Inthanu in My Dear Loser and Our Skyy.

His next series is One Night Steal, wherein he co-stars with SOTUS: The Series star and fellow Our Skyy alumnus Krist Perawat Sangpotirat as well as Sing Harit Cheewagaroon, Jan Ployshompoo Supasap, and Punpun Sutatta Udomsilp. The show premiered on November 24, 2019.

In 2021, Purim portrayed the role of "Krathing" (manga name: Eiji Kanda), a retired boxer because of his medical condition, turned into a baker in the Thai adaptation of Antique Bakery, known as Baker Boys with Singto Prachaya, Lee Thanat and Foei Patara.
 
Currently Purim is, portraying the role of "Non", boyfriend of Meen who is cheating her with on her friend WanWan in P.S I Hate You.Through this drama he collaborated with his previous co-stars Jan Ployshompoo Supasap from One Night Steal and Lee Thanat from Baker Boys. In the series, Jan plays the role of  Purims's girlfriend (Meen) and Lee plays Meen's ex boyfriend

Filmography

Film

Television

Discography 
Singles

Sleep Runway

The Comet (One Night Steal)

References

External links
Pluem (Purim Rattanaruangwattana) on IMDb

1997 births
Living people
Purim Rattanaruangwattana
Purim Rattanaruangwattana
Purim Rattanaruangwattana
Purim Rattanaruangwattana